The American Angler's Book Embracing the Natural History of Sporting Fish and the Art of Taking Them with Instructions in Fly-Fishing, Fly-Making, and Rod-Making and Directions for Fish-Breeding, to which is appended Dies Piscatoriae Describing Noted Fishing-Places, and The Pleasure of Solitary Fly-Fishing is an early American angling book by Thaddeus Norris (1811-1877) first published in 1864.  Norris was known as Uncle Thad and commonly referred to in American angling history as "The American Walton".

Synopsis

The American Angler's Book provides encyclopedic coverage of all aspects of fishing as practiced in North America in the mid-1800s.  It covers tackle, techniques, target species and the best fishing locations. It has been credited with being the first significant American work to cover aspects of fly fishing.

Reviews
Shortly after its publication, the New York Times praised the work as encyclopedic and well illustrated on the subject of angling.

In his 1901 work My Angling Friends, pisciculturist Fred Mather wrote of Norris:

In a survey of the Reed Draper Angling Collection at Central Michigan University these comments were made on Norris's work in The American Angler's Book:

Contents
 Chapter I Angling (pages 27–38)
 Chapter II General Remarks on Fish (pages )
 Chapter III Tackle in General (pages )
 Chapter IV The Perch Family-Percidae (pages )
 Chapter V The Pike Family (pages 77–125 )
 Chapter VI The Carp Family-Cyprinidae (pages 126-152)
 Chapter VII The Herring Family Clupeidae (pages 165-176)
 Chapter VIII Catfish and Eels (pages 177-190)
 Chapter IX The Salmon Family Salmonidae (pages 191-276)
 Chapter X Salt-water and Fishing (pages 277-304)
 Chapter XI Trout Fly-Fishing—Outfit and Tackle (pages 305-326)
 Chapter XII Trout Fly-Fishing—The Stream (pages 327-344)
 Chapter XIII Salmon Fishing (pages 345-378)
 Chapter XIV Salmon Rivers of the British Provinces (pages 379-404)
 Chapter XV Repairs, Knots, Loops and Receipts (pages 405-418)
 Chapter XVI Fly-Making (pages 419-440)
 Chapter XVII Rod-Making (pages 441-458)
 Chapter XVIII Fish Breeding (pages 459-488)
 Dies Piscatoriae (pages 489-599) (Latin for "A Day of Fishing")
 The "Houseless Anglers"
 The Noonday Roast
 First Nooning—Trout-fishing in Hamilton County, New York
 Second Nooning—Trout-fishing in New Hampshire
 Third Nooning—Trout-fishing in the regions of Lake Superior
 Fourth Nooning—Trout-fishing in the Adirondacks
 Fly-Fishing Alone
 The Angler's Sabbath
 Conclusion

Editions
 First - 1864 published by Butler, Philadelphia
 Second - 1865 published by Porter & Coates, Philadelphia (A Memorial Edition)
 Third - 1868 published by Porter & Coates, Philadelphia
 Printings by Porter & Coates, Philadelphia 1881, 1886, 1891
 Limited Edition Reprint, 1994 by Derrydale Press, New York
 Excerpts - Norris on Trout Fishing: A Lifetime of Angling Insights (Fly-Fishing Classics Series) (2008) Edited by Paul Schullery

See also
 Bibliography of fly fishing

Notes

Further reading
 
 
 

1864 non-fiction books
Angling literature
Fly fishing literature
American non-fiction books
Recreational fishing in the United States